Wallowa Lake State Park is a state park located in northeast Oregon in the United States.  It is at the southern shore of Wallowa Lake, near the city of Joseph in Wallowa County. The town of Wallowa Lake is situated next to the park.

Wallowa Lake State Park has a variety of activities, including hiking wilderness trails, horseback riding, bumper boat, canoeing, miniature golf, and a tramway to the top of one of the mountains (a rise of 3,700 feet).  Wildlife is abundant in the area.

Amenities
There is overnight camping for tents and RVs with full hookup.  The campground has yurts, cabins, tepees, and reservable group tents.  There is swimming and a boat ramp for the lake.

See also
 List of Oregon state parks

References

External links
  from Oregon Parks and Recreation Department

State parks of Oregon
Parks in Wallowa County, Oregon
Wallowa–Whitman National Forest
Joseph, Oregon